The 2014 Golden Spin of Zagreb was the 47th edition of the annual senior-level international figure skating competition held in Zagreb, Croatia. A part of the 2014–15 ISU Challenger Series, event was held at the Dom sportova on December 4–6, 2014. Medals were awarded in the disciplines of men's singles, ladies' singles, pair skating, and ice dancing.

Medalists

Results

Men

Ladies

Pairs

Ice dancing

External links
 Results
 Official website

Golden Spin of Zagreb
Golden Spin Of Zagreb, 2014
Golden Spin Of Zagreb, 2014